Claus Asmussen (born 12 February 1949 in Copenhagen) is a Danish musician (guitar), actor and composer, the son of jazz violinist Svend Asmussen, and a central member of the Danish pop bands 'Emanuel D.P.', 'Sir Henry & His Butlers' (1965–80) and The 'Shu-Bi-Dua' (1974–2005).

Asmussen has not been very active on stage since 2005, but he was on a tour to Afghanistan with the other ex-Shubs, Michael Hardinger, Bosse Hall, Henning Tingleff and Klaus Poulsen, under the name Veterans, where in April 2010 they played a couple of concerts for the Danish soldiers. He runs the audio production company Audiomedia.

Filmography 
1989: Den røde tråd
1992: Shu-bi-dua i Tivoli
1993: Shu-bi-40 – Et juleeventyr (TV Special documentary short) 
2003: Shu-bi-dua – tanketorsk eller stjerneskud?

Discography 

With 'Sir Henry & His Butlers'
1967: Camp (Columbia Records)
1967: H2O (Parlophone)
1967: Sir Henry & His Butlers (Columbia Records)
1973: Listen! (EMI Records, Parlophone)
1980: Sir Henry (EMI Records)
1990: La' Det Gry, La' Det Gro (Polydor Records)

With 'Shu-Bi-Dua'
1974: Shu•bi•dua (Polydor Records), as sound engineer
1975: Shu•bi•dua 2 (Polydor Records)
1976: Shu•bi•dua 3 (Polydor Records)
1977: Shu•bi•dua 4 (Polydor Records)
1978: 78'eren (Polydor Records)
1979: Shu•bi•dua 6 (Polydor Records)
1980: Shu•bi•dua 7 (Storkophon)
1982: Shu•bi•dua 8 (Storkophon)
1982: Shu•bi•dua 9 (Balstram)
1983: Shu•bi•dua 10 (Balstram)
1985: Shu•bi•dua 11 (Hardazz I/S)
1987: Shu•bi•dua 12 (Shu-Bi-Dua Self-release)
1990: 78'eren (Elap Music)
1992: SShu•bi•dua 13 (Elap Music)
1993: Shu•bi•dua 14 (Elap Music)
1994: Shu•bi•40 (CMC Records)
1995: Shu•bi•dua 15 (CMC Records)
1997: Shu•bi•dua 16 (CMC Records)
2000: Shu•bi•dua 17 (CMC Records)
2001: Rap Jul & Godt Nytår (CMC Records)
2004: Symfo•ni•dua (CMC Records), with 'DR RadioUnderholdningsOrkestret'
2005: Shu•bi•dua 18 (Peaked in DEN: #2)

With 'Emanuel D.P.'
1976 Emanuel D.P. (Polydor Records)

References 

Musicians from Copenhagen
Danish guitarists
Danish composers
Male composers
Danish male film actors
1949 births
Living people